Styria may refer to:

 Styria, Slovenia
 Styria, Austria